The orange-eyed thornbird (Phacellodomus erythrophthalmus) is a species of bird in the family Furnariidae. It is endemic to the Atlantic Forest in eastern Brazil. It formerly included P. ferrugineigula as a subspecies, but under the common name red-eyed thornbird. After the two were split, that English name was confusingly used for both species briefly, although it only really is fitting for P. ferrugineigula. To avoid this confusion, P. ferrugineigula is now generally called the orange-breasted thornbird. Unlike that species, the orange-eyed thornbird has conspicuously bright orange eyes, far less rufous below and on the crown (essentially restricted to the throat and frontlet), and the entire tail rufous. The two also have different voices and are locally sympatric in São Paulo without evidence of interbreeding.

References

External links

orange-eyed thornbird
Birds of the Atlantic Forest
Endemic birds of Brazil
orange-eyed thornbird
Taxonomy articles created by Polbot